Sughanchi (also Romanized as Sūghānchī; also known as Mehmān Bolāghī) is a village in Varqeh Rural District, in the Central District of Charuymaq County, East Azerbaijan Province, Iran. At the 2006 census, its population was 22, in 5 families.

References 

Populated places in Charuymaq County